Both the civil and state flag of the German state of Saxony feature a bicolour of white over green, similar to the Austrian province of Styria although they are historically not related to each other. The state flag is similar to the civil flag, except it is defaced in the centre with the coat of arms of Saxony. The colours of both flags were officially decided as state colours in 1815. The aristocracy used mostly and in first time the quadrangular version and later the rectangular.

Overview
The civil bicolour flag of white over green was used before World War II, and formally abolished in 1935, under the reforms of the Third Reich. It was readopted 1945 when Saxony became a state again, and abolished 1952 under governing reforms of the German Democratic Republic. When Germany was reunited, Saxony became a state again, and so the flag was finally officially readopted in 1991, having been a much used symbol during the demonstrations in the German Democratic Republic in 1989/90.

Landtag of the Free State of Saxony
Landtag of the Free State of Saxony uses its own flag.

Minority flags
Paragraph 4 of Article 2 of the Constitution of the Free State of Saxony guarantees other flags equality alongside the Saxon state flag.

Gallery

See also
 Coat of arms of Saxony

References

Saxony
Culture of Saxony
Saxony
Saxony
Saxony